Mok Tse Che is a village in the Hebe Haven area of Sai Kung District, Hong Kong.

Administration
Mok Tse Che is a recognized village under the New Territories Small House Policy.

History
Mok Tse Che was part of the inter-village grouping, the Ho Chung Tung or Ho Chung Seven Villages, which had its centre in Ho Chung.

At the time of the 1911 census, the population of Mok Tse Che was 51. The number of males was 20.

See also
 Wo Mei, an adjacent village located north of Mok Tse Che.

References

External links

 Delineation of area of existing village Mok Tse Che (Sai Kung) for election of resident representative (2019 to 2022)

Villages in Sai Kung District, Hong Kong